Ein Gev is a kibbutz in northern Israel. Located on the eastern shore of the Sea of Galilee near the ruins of the Greco-Roman settlement of Hippos, it falls under the jurisdiction of Emek HaYarden Regional Council. In  its population was ..

History

Kibbutz Ein Gev, named after the nearby Arab village Al-Nuqayb, came into being on 6 July 1937 during the 1936–1939 Arab revolt in Palestine as a "tower and stockade" settlement, a common debut for many kibbutzim during that era, and quickly established itself as a viable community. The original settlers were immigrants from Czechoslovakia, Germany, Austria, and the Baltic countries. Using intensive cultivation methods, they developed banana plantations.  They also fished the nearby Lake Kinneret (Sea of Galilee). By 1947 it had a population of 450.

Situated along a border shared with Syria, Ein Gev was shelled during the Battles of the Kinarot Valley and in other engagements during the 1948 Arab–Israeli War. Shooting incidents remained common for the next nineteen years. These dangers were only eliminated when Israel occupied the neighbouring Golan Heights in the 1967 Six-Day War.

Due to the fact it was situated in the Israel–Syria demilitarised zone under the 1949 Armistice Agreements, Ein Gev was claimed by Syria as its territory during negotiations for a peace agreement in the 1990s. The Israeli government rejected the claims, as it would have led to Syria having territory west of the 1923 border between Mandatory Palestine and the French Mandate of Syria.

Archaeology
Near the present-day village an important archaeological site from the Mesolithic Kebaran culture has been excavated.

The Greco-Roman Decapolis city of Sussita/Hippos stood on the hill overlooking the kibbutz. The archaeological site is currently being excavated.

Economy
The kibbutz operates a holiday resort and a fish restaurant. Agricultural branches include banana plantations and dairy farming. The kibbutz built a 2,500-seat concert hall to accommodate the Ein Gev Music Festival, held annually during Passover.

Notable people

 Teddy Kollek, a founding member of Kibbutz Ein Gev who became mayor of Jerusalem
 Effi Eitam, retired  brigadier general
 Mendel Nun, expert on the history of the Sea of Galilee, initiator of the House of Anchors Fishing Museum, which he established in 1995. See one biography here

References

External links
Official website 

Kibbutzim
Kibbutz Movement
Populated places established in 1937
Jewish villages in Mandatory Palestine
Natufian sites
Populated places in Northern District (Israel)
1937 establishments in Mandatory Palestine
Tourist attractions in the Golan Heights
Latvian-Jewish culture in Israel
Lithuanian-Jewish culture in Israel
Austrian-Jewish culture in Israel
Czech-Jewish culture in Israel
German-Jewish culture in Israel
Slovak-Jewish culture in Israel
Sea of Galilee
Kebaran culture